The 2004 World Ringette Championships (2004 WRC) was an international ringette tournament and the 7th (XII) World Ringette Championships. The tournament was organized by the International Ringette Federation (IRF) and was contested in Stockholm, Sweden, between November 23 and 27, 2004. The game for the world title final between Canada and Finland took place at the Visättra SportCenter in Huddinge, Stockholm, Sweden.

Overview

Team Finland took the world championship by crushing Team Canada 9–3 in the final. Since the 2004 World Championships, Finland has dominated the international senior level of ringette. Anna Vanhatalo was elected the best goaltender of the tournament.

Venue

Teams

Final standings

Rosters

Team Finland
The 2004 Team Finland Senior team included players  (Captain), and goalie Anna Vanhatalo. Pasi Kataja was the team's head coach.

Team Canada
Team Canada competed in the 2004 World Ringette Championships. The 2004 Team Canada team included the following:

See also
 World Ringette Championships
 International Ringette Federation
  Canada national ringette team
  Finland national ringette team
  Sweden national ringette team
  United States national ringette team

References

World Ringette Championships
Ringette
Ringette competitions